Neil Peter Hammerton Hudson   is a British politician, academic, and veterinary surgeon who has been the Member of Parliament (MP) for Penrith and The Border since 2019. A member of the Conservative Party, he has served on the Environment, Food and Rural Affairs Committee since 2020. He is the first Veterinary Surgeon in the House of Commons since 1884.

Early life and academic career
Hudson studied Veterinary Medicine at the University of Cambridge. While there he was in the Footlights theatrical group. He has performed four times at the Edinburgh Festival Fringe.

Hudson completed an internship at the University of Sydney, gaining a Diploma in Veterinary Clinical Studies and later a PhD in Equine Grass Sickness and Equine Gastroenterology at the University of Edinburgh. Prior to his election to Parliament, Hudson was a Senior Veterinary Clinical Lecturer at the Royal (Dick) School of Veterinary Studies. He is a Fellow of the Royal College of Veterinary Surgeons (FRCVS), a Principal Fellow of the Higher Education Academy (PFHEA), and is an RCVS Diplomate in Equine Internal Medicine (DEIM).

Parliamentary career
Hudson was elected as the Conservative Party MP for Penrith and The Border in the 2019 general election with a majority of 18,519. The constituency's previous Conservative MP Rory Stewart had stood down in October 2019. Hudson had previously contested the Newcastle upon Tyne North and Edinburgh South seats in the 2005 and 2010 general election respectively. Hudson has been a member of the Environment, Food and Rural Affairs Select Committee since March 2020 and in this role has instigated Parliamentary Inquiries on Rural Mental Health, Food Security, Movement of Animals Across Borders, Marine Mammals, Post-Brexit Farm Payments, and Pet Welfare and Abuse.

Personal life 
Hudson is married with two children.

References

External links

Living people
UK MPs 2019–present
Year of birth missing (living people)
Conservative Party (UK) MPs for English constituencies
Academics of the University of Edinburgh
Alumni of Queens' College, Cambridge
21st-century British politicians